was a Japanese swimmer and journalist. He competed in the men's 100 metre backstroke event at the 1928 Summer Olympics. He later became a sports journalist.

References

External links
 

1908 births
1986 deaths
Olympic swimmers of Japan
Swimmers at the 1928 Summer Olympics
Place of birth missing
Japanese male backstroke swimmers
20th-century Japanese people